Serge Dube was born on August 13, 1979 in Greater Sudbury, Canada. He is a Canadian former professional ice hockey defence-man. He was also formerly the head coach of the Laredo Bucks in the Central Hockey League for two seasons through to the 2011–12 season. He played for AHL, San Antonio Rampage, CHL, Laredo Bucks, BNL, Bracknell Bees. His playing career was between 2002 and 2011.

Career statistics

Awards and honours

Oil Kings Memorial Shootout Most Valuable Player - May 26, 2019
Team - Mississippi Hockey 
Division - Rec 3, Tier 3

References

External links

1979 births
Living people
Bracknell Bees players
Canadian ice hockey defencemen
Laredo Bucks players
San Antonio Rampage players
Sudbury Wolves players
Ice hockey people from Ontario
Sportspeople from Greater Sudbury
Canadian expatriate ice hockey players in England